Ingenic Semiconductor is a Chinese fabless semiconductor company based in Beijing, China founded in 2005. They purchased licenses for the MIPS architecture instruction sets in 2009 and design CPU-microarchitectures based on them. They also design system on a chip products including their CPUs and licensed semiconductor intellectual property blocks from third parties, such as Vivante Corporation, commission the fabrication of integrated circuits at semiconductor fabrication plants and sell them.

XBurst microarchitecture 

Early XBurst CPU microarchitectures were based upon the MIPS32 revision 1 and newer models are based on the MIPS32 revision 2 instruction set.  It implements an 8-stage pipeline.  XBurst CPU technology consists of 2 parts:
 A RISC/SIMD/DSP hybrid instruction set architecture which enables the processor to have the capability of computation, signal processing and video processing. This includes the Media Extension Unit (MXU), a 32-bit SIMD extension. All JZ47xx series CPUs with Xburst uA support MXU, except for the JZ4730.
 MXU has its own register set, distinct from the general purpose MIPS registers. It consists of sixteen 32-bit data registers and a 32-bit control register. CPUs which support MXU are used in MIPS Creator single-board computers. They are also present in various tablets, handheld game devices, and embedded devices.

XBurst2 microarchitecture 

XBurst2 development was, in summer 2013, expected to be completed by the first half of 2014. However, XBurst2 was eventually introduced in 2020 in the X2000, with the microarchitecture offering a dual-issue/dual-threaded CPU design based on MIPS32 Release 5.

XBurst-based SoCs 

SoCs incorporating the XBurst microarchitecture:

Adoption 

XBurst1-based SoCs are commonly used in tablet computers, portable media players, digital photo frames and GPS devices:

The JZ4730 CPU is used in the Skytone Alpha-400 and its variants. The Jz4720 is utilized in the Copyleft Hardware project Ben NanoNote. Another popular device, the Dingoo gaming handheld, uses the JZ4732, a de facto JZ4740. Game Gadget is using the JZ4750. Velocity Micro T103 Cruz and T301 Cruz 7-Inch Android 2.0 Tablets used JZ4760. The JZ4770 SoC is used in several of the Ainol Novo 7 Android tablets and 3Q Tablet PC Qoo! IC0707A/4A40. JZ4770 SoC is also used in the dedicated handheld NEOGEO-X and open source handheld GCW Zero running on OpenDingux. The JZ4780 is used in ImgTec's MIPS based single-board computer (SBC); The Creator CI20

See also 

 Lantiq
 Cavium
 Loongson
 Qualcomm Atheros
 MediaTek
 OpenWrt
 Ainol
 Ben Nanonote

References

External links 
 
 Application Processor Overview
 Linux developer page
 rockbox.org, Hardware docs
 MT-V656 (JZ4755)
 Ingenic Semiconductor Licenses MIPS32® Architecture for Mobile Devices (January 4, 2011) 
 EE Times Article

Fabless semiconductor companies
Embedded microprocessors
Companies based in Beijing
Electronics companies established in 2005
Chinese brands
Microprocessors made in China
MIPS architecture